Double Danger can refer to:

 Double Danger (1920 film), a 1920 silent film
 Double Danger (1938 film), a 1938 film